The 1986–87 Divizia B was the 47th season of the second tier of the Romanian football league system.

The format has been maintained to three series, each of them having 18 teams. At the end of the season the winners of the series promoted to Divizia A and the last four places from each series relegated to Divizia C.

Team changes

To Divizia B
Promoted from Divizia C
 Minerul Gura Humorului
 Unirea Dinamo Focșani
 FEPA 74 Bârlad
 Unirea Slobozia
 Autobuzul București
 ROVA Roșiori
 Gloria Pandurii Târgu Jiu
 Minerul Paroșeni
 Steaua CFR Cluj
 Unio Satu Mare
 Inter Sibiu
 Poiana Câmpina

Relegated from Divizia A
 Politehnica Timișoara
 ASA Târgu Mureș
 Bihor Oradea

From Divizia B
Relegated to Divizia C
 Metalul Plopeni
 Muscelul Câmpulung
 CFR Timișoara
 Dunărea Călărași
 Avântul Reghin
 Unirea Alba Iulia
 Chimia Fălticeni
 Șoimii IPA Sibiu
 Înfrățirea Oradea
 Minerul Vatra Dornei
 ICSIM București
 Minerul Lupeni

Promoted to Divizia A
 Oțelul Galați
 Flacăra Moreni
 Jiul Petroșani

Renamed teams
Aripile Bacău was renamed as Aripile Victoria Bacău.

Delta Tulcea was renamed as Delta Dinamo Tulcea.

League tables

Serie I

Serie II

Serie III

See also 
 1986–87 Divizia A

References

Liga II seasons
Romania
2